Honuj (also Romanized as Honūj and Henuj; also known as  Honū, Honūk, Huni, and Hūtak) is a village in Ekhtiarabad Rural District, in the Central District of Kerman County, Kerman Province, Iran. At the 2006 census, its population was 67, in 20 families.

References 

Populated places in Kerman County